Roxana Daniela Popa Nedelcu (born June 2, 1997 in Constanța) is a Romanian-born Spanish artistic gymnast who has represented Spain in all her international competitions. Popa first came into contact with gymnastics in her native Romania, where there is a long tradition in the sport, and there she had her early training. Now, she trains at the Spanish National Training Center (CARD), and is a part of the EGAD Los Cantos Alcorcon in Madrid. A member of the Spain women's national gymnastics team, she competed at the 2013, 2014, 2015 and 2019 World Championships, as well as the 2020 Summer Olympics.

Personal life
Popa was born on 2 June 1997 in Constanța, Romania, and moved to Spain in 2004. Besides her native language, Romanian, she is also fluent in Spanish, English, and speaks a little French. Popa's idols are Romanian gymnasts Nadia Comăneci, Cătălina Ponor, and Larisa Iordache.

In addition to gymnastics, Popa has been involved in dancing since she was seven years old, and has competed in national level competitions. She taught dance at a school in Madrid while recovering from her knee injuries.
She has eight cats.

Early career
Popa began training in artistic gymnastics when she was four years old.  In 2004 she moved to Spain to be with her family, who had moved two years prior. She competed at the Spanish Nationals in 2008, and despite winning everything, she did not make the podium as she did not yet have her Spanish citizenship. This was featured on a documentary of Canal Plus España.  In mid-2008 she received Spanish citizenship.

When she was finally cleared to compete for Spain, she sustained an elbow injury training on uneven bars, which required surgery and intensive rehab, leaving her out of competition for a few years.

Junior career
Popa represented Spain at the 2012 European Championships in Brussels. She qualified to the all-around and vault final, and was a third reserve for the floor final. She ended up placing sixth in the vault final and eleventh in the all-around.

Senior career

2013 
Popa's senior debut came in 2013, at the Cottbus World Cup, where she did not make any event finals. Later that month, she was named to the Spanish team for the European Championships.  While there she qualified fifth into the all-around and seventh to the floor exercise final. She placed sixth in the all-around final and seventh on floor exercise.

In June she competed in the Mediterranean Games. However, she had a bad landing in the warm-up prior to the all-around and sat out the rest of the competition. The injury was not serious, and Popa was well enough to claim the Spanish all-around title the following month. She was named to the Spanish team for the World Championships at the end of summer.  During qualifications, Popa qualified tenth to the all-around, but missed out on the event finals. She placed twelfth in the all-around.

Popa was announced as a competitor for the Mexico Open in November and the Glasgow World Cup in December. In Mexico, she struggled a little on the first day of competition, placing fourth, but came back strong to win the gold medal, 0.200 points over the silver medalist, USA's Peyton Ernst. In Glasgow, things started out rough, when she bailed on her double-twisting Yurchenko vault for not getting the block she needed, and performed a very simple Yurchenko layout vault. She performed well on her other three events and finished fifth.

2014 
In early 2014 Popa was announced as a competitor for the American Cup taking place on March 1 and the Tokyo World Cup on April 5–6. At the American Cup she had good vault and beam rotations, but hit her feet on her Pak salto on bars. On floor exercise, she impressed the crowd with her floor routine and finished in sixth place.  At the Tokyo World Cup she finished in second place behind Vanessa Ferrari of Italy. Later that month she competed at a friendly meet against gymnasts from Great Britain and Germany, winning all-around gold and team bronze.

In early May, she competed at the Spanish Cup, winning every event except balance beam, on which she finished in fifth place. A few weeks later she competed at the European Championships, placing sixth with her team, seventh on floor exercise, and eighth on uneven bars. In July, she competed at the Spanish Nationals, defending her title in the all-around and winning gold on every individual event except balance beam, where she won silver. At the World Championships she qualified to the all around.  She finished 13th during the final.

At the Blume Memorial in November Popa had upgraded routines on bars and floor, performing very well.  She was scheduled to compete at the Mexico Open and was considered the front-runner to win, but suffered a knee injury in training the morning of the competition and withdrew. The injury was diagnosed as a torn ACL and meniscus, and required surgery. Upon diagnosis, her doctors discovered the injury was an old one, and had gone unnoticed until December.

2015–16 
Popa returned to competition in October 2015, competing at the Novara Cup.  Later that month she represented Spain at the World Championships but only competed on uneven bars.

Popa was scheduled to compete at the Olympic Test Event in April 2016; however, in March she re-injured her right knee causing a meniscus rupture which prevented her from qualifying to the 2016 Olympic Games.

2019 
Popa did not compete for 3 years.  She made her comeback at the first Spanish League in February 2019 and continued competing domestically for the first half of the year.  She made her international comeback at the Szombathely Challenge Cup where she won bronze on the uneven bars.  Popa next competed at the 2nd Heerenveen Friendly where she helped Spain finish second behind the Netherlands and individually she placed ninth in the all-around.

At the 2019 World Championships, Popa, alongside teammates Cintia Rodríguez, Alba Petisco, Ana Pérez, and Marina González, finished 12th as a team during qualifications.  Although they did not qualify to the team final, they qualified a team to the 2020 Olympic Games in Tokyo, giving Spain its first team berth at the Olympic Games since 2004.  Individually Popa qualified to the floor exercise final.  She finished sixth in the final, scoring 13.800. When asked about her comeback, which has been called miraculous, Popa said "I would not have been able to totally retire from gymnastics. I did well psychologically to heal myself. For me, every day is a challenge to face fears, anguish, and the anxiety of my imperfect knee. But I still keep going. I know that there are elements that I cannot do as a precaution in order to keep the knee in place, but if I have to take that risk, I will do it without hesitation."

2021
In June, Popa won the gold medal on floor at the FIT Challenge, and was selected to the Spanish women's artistic gymnastics team for the postponed 2020 Summer Olympics alongside Marina González, Alba Petisco and Laura Bechdejú. The team finished 12th in qualifications and did not reach the final. Individually, Popa qualified to the all-around final where she finished 22nd.

Competitive History

References

1997 births
Living people
Spanish female artistic gymnasts
Spanish people of Romanian descent
Sportspeople from Constanța
Gymnasts from Madrid
Romanian expatriate sportspeople in Spain
Competitors at the 2013 Mediterranean Games
Mediterranean Games competitors for Spain
Gymnasts at the 2020 Summer Olympics
Olympic gymnasts of Spain